An Adventure in the Autumn Woods is a 1913 American short drama film directed by  D. W. Griffith.

Cast
 Mae Marsh as The Girl
 W. Chrystie Miller as The Grandfather
 Lionel Barrymore as The Father
 Walter Miller as The Boy
 Alfred Paget as The Woodsman
 Frank Opperman as First Thief
 Charles Hill Mailes as Second Thief
 Harry Carey as Third Thief
 Adolph Lestina as At Trading Post
 Walter P. Lewis as In Posse
 Joseph McDermott as At Trading Post

See also
 List of American films of 1913
 Harry Carey filmography
 D. W. Griffith filmography
 Lionel Barrymore filmography

References

External links

1913 films
1913 drama films
1913 short films
Silent American drama films
Films directed by D. W. Griffith
American silent short films
American black-and-white films
1910s American films
American drama short films
1910s English-language films